HMS  Östergötland (J20)  was the lead ship of the .

Design

Due to time and cost, HSwMS Östergötland, like the other ships in the class, was built largely according to the drawings of the Öland-class destroyer. The length of the ship was 111.8 meters and the beam was 11.2 meters. Due to different equipment, however, the new vessels became about 200 tons heavier, which gave a draft of 3.7 meters, against the Öland-class of 3.4 meters. The machinery consisted of two oil-fired steam boilers of the Babcock & Wilcox brand, which supplied steam with a pressure of 32 bars to two steam turbines of the DeLaval brand, which in turn each operated a propeller. The machinery gave the effect 47,000 horsepower on the axles, which gave a top speed of 35 knots.

The main guns consisted of four 120 mm (4.7 in) guns m/44  placed in two double towers, one on the foredeck and one on the aft deck. From the beginning, the air defense consisted of seven 40 mm automatic cannons w / 48 E. These were placed two for the superstructure, one on each side amidships, and three on the aft bridge. Around 1965, the middle cannon on the aft bridge was replaced by the anti-aircraft missile Robot 07, and to increase the stability of the ship, the two cannons were removed at the same time amidships. For the same reason, all six torpedo tubes were also placed in a tube rack, having previously stood in two racks. There were also two submarine bombers and 58 mines on board.

History
Östergötland was built at Götaverken in Gothenburg and was launched on 25 June 1956 in which her sea trial took place in 1957 and commissioned in 1958.

In 1961, the fleet's long-haul vessel HSwMS Älvsnabben (M01) underwent a review and instead Östergötland went on a long voyage together with HSwMS Öland (J16). The voyage went to the multiple ports.

Östergötland was decommissioned on 1 July 1982 and sold in 1985 for scrapping in Spain.

References

Notes

Print

External links

Östergötland-class destroyers
Ships built in Gothenburg
1956 ships